Cireșu may refer to several places in Romania:

 Cireșu, Brăila, a commune in Brăila County
 Cireșu, Mehedinți, a commune in Mehedinți County
 Cireșu, a village in Căteasca Commune, Argeș County
 Cireșu, a village in Mânzălești Commune, Buzău County
 Cireșu and Cireșu Mic, villages in Criciova Commune, Timiș County
 Cireșu, a village in Stroești Commune, Vâlcea County
 Cireșu, a tributary of the Latorița in Vâlcea County
 Cireșu, a tributary of the Putna in Vrancea County

See also 
 Cireș (disambiguation)
 Valea Cireșului (disambiguation)